The 1936–37 Egypt Cup was the 16th edition of the Egypt Cup.

The final was held on 11 June 1937. The match was contested by Al Ahly and El Sekka El Hadid, with Al Ahly winning 3–2.

Quarter-finals 

|}
Replays

|}

Semi-finals 

|}

Final

References 

 

3
Egypt Cup
1936–37 in Egyptian football